Damnation Alley may refer to:
Damnation Alley, a 1967 science fiction short story by Roger Zelazny, expanded into a novel in 1969.
Damnation Alley (film), a 1977 film, directed by Jack Smight, loosely based on the novel by Roger Zelazny.
"Damnation Alley", a song by Hawkwind from their 1977 album Quark, Strangeness and Charm, also based on the novel.
 Damnation Alley (album), a 1982 album by female-fronted heavy metal band Bitch.